Johnny Cannizzaro is an American stage, film and television actor, screenwriter, playwright, musician and poet. He had a role in Clint Eastwood's Jersey Boys.

Early life
Cannizzaro was born in Bensonhurst, Brooklyn. He is one of three children including a twin brother.

Career
In 2023, Cannizzaro appeared in a season 1 episode of Quantum Leap (2022 TV series)

In 2022, Cannizzaro appeared in a season 16 episode of Criminal Minds: Evolution

In 2022, Cannizzaro appeared in a season five episode of New Amsterdam (2018 TV series)

In 2022, Cannizzaro appeared in a season four episode of The Rookie (TV series)

In 2022, Cannizzaro guest starred in a season one episode of NCIS: Hawaiʻi.

In 2021, Cannizzaro appeared in a fifth-season episode of S.W.A.T. (2017 TV series).

In 2019, Cannizzaro received a screenwriting fellowship with Taliesin Nexus.

In 2018, Cannizzaro's writing was selected to be performed in the ABC Discovers Talent showcase in both New York and Los Angeles.

In 2017, Cannizzaro produced and starred in the independent film 'The Obituary' opposite General Hospital alum Anthony Geary.

In 2016, Cannizzaro guest starred as "Franco" in the series premiere of USA Network drama Colony (TV series).

In 2014, Clint Eastwood cast Cannizzaro to play Nick Devito in the film adaptation of Tony Award-winning musical Jersey Boys.

In 2013, Cannizzaro made his network t.v debut in Frank Darabont's 1940's gangster drama Mob City.

In 2012, Cannizzaro played Ronnie Fusto in a "A Ring in Brooklyn", a stage musical by Alan Fleishman and Eric Dodson at the Noho Arts Center in North Hollywood, Ca.

In 2010, Cannizzaro was cast in a warehouse production of Stephen Sondheim's Into the Woods in downtown Los Angeles starring General Hospital's Anthony Geary and directed by Calvin Remsberg.

In 2009, Cannizzaro recorded an original song for Richard M. Sherman, Academy Award winning songwriter and composer of Mary Poppins, The Jungle Book.

References 

https://web.archive.org/web/20140330112654/http://www.playbill.com/news/article/189379-Footage-from-Clint-Eastwoods-Jersey-Boys-Film-Presented-at-Las-Vegas-CinemaCon

External links 
 
 www.JohnnyCannizzaro.com

Living people
American male film actors
American male stage actors
American male television actors
Holmdel High School alumni
People from Bensonhurst, Brooklyn
Male actors from New York City
21st-century American male actors
Male actors from New Jersey
1983 births